is a Japanese mixed martial artist. He has fought for most of his career in the Shooto organization.

Mixed martial arts career
Kojima was the Shooto Bantamweight Champion from 2006 until 2010, when an ACL injury in his right knee prevented him from defending the title in the mandatory time period. Kojima had the most famous flyweight feud to date with former reigning champion Mamoru Yamaguchi.

ONE Fighting Championship
Kojima made his debut at the organization with a submission win over Filipino Rey Docyogen at ONE FC: Return of Warriors at Putra Indoor Stadium in Kuala Lumpur on February 2. With the win, Kojima will get a shot at the ONE FC World Flyweight Title.

Kojima was originally slated to fight former UFC vet and Shooto Bantamweight Champion Yasuhiro Urushitani for the inaugural ONE FC Flyweight Championship, but Urushitani was forced out of the bout due to injury and replaced with Andrew Leone. However, just days before the event, an injury to Leone scrapped the bout from the card all together, after leaving Kojima without an opponent for the event.

Championships and accomplishments
Fight Matrix
2011 Comeback of the Year
Shooto
Shooto Flyweight Championship (1 Time)
Three Successful Title Defenses
Most Successful Title Defenses in the history of the Flyweight Division (3)

Mixed martial arts record

|-
| Win
| align=center| 14–6–5
| Tatsuya So
| Decision (split)
| VTJ in Okinawa
| 
| align=center| 3
| align=center| 5:00
| Naha, Okinawa, Japan
| 
|-
| Loss
| align=center| 13–6–5
| Andrew Leone
| Decision (unanimous)
| ONE FC: War of Nations
| 
| align=center| 3
| align=center| 5:00
| Kuala Lumpur, Malaysia
| 
|-
| Win
| align=center| 13–5–5
| Rey Docyogen
| Submission (guillotine choke)
| ONE FC: Return of Warriors
| 
| align=center| 2
| align=center| 4:47
| Kuala Lumpur, Malaysia
| 
|-
| Loss
| align=center| 12–5–5
| Nam Jin Jo
| Decision (Majority)
| Shooto: 3rd Round
| 
| align=center| 3
| align=center| 5:00
| Tokyo, Japan
| 
|-
| Win
| align=center| 12–4–5
| Kiyotaka Shimizu
| Decision (unanimous)
| Shooto: Shooto the Shoot 2011
| 
| align=center| 3
| align=center| 5:00
| Tokyo, Japan
| 
|-
| Win
| align=center| 11–4–5
| Masaaki Sugawara
| Decision (split)
| Shooto: Gig Tokyo 7
| 
| align=center| 3
| align=center| 5:00
| Tokyo, Japan
| 
|-
| Loss
| align=center| 10–4–5
| Jussier Formiga
| Decision (unanimous)
| Shooto: Revolutionary Exchanges 1: Undefeated
| 
| align=center| 3
| align=center| 5:00
| Tokyo, Japan
| 
|-
|-
| Win
| align=center| 10–3–5
| Yuki Shoujou
| Submission (rear-naked choke)
| Shooto: Shooto Tradition 6
| 
| align=center| 3
| align=center| 0:38
| Tokyo, Japan
| 
|-
| Draw
| align=center| 9–3–5
| Jesse Taitano
| Draw
| Shooto: Shooto Tradition 5
| 
| align=center| 2
| align=center| 5:00
| Tokyo, Japan
| 
|-
| Win
| align=center| 9–3–4
| Mamoru Yamaguchi
| Submission (guillotine choke)
| Shooto: Shooto Tradition 2
| 
| align=center| 3
| align=center| 3:42
| Tokyo, Japan
| 
|-
| Loss
| align=center| 8–3–4
| So Tazawa
| Technical Submission (armbar)
| Shooto: Back To Our Roots 7
| 
| align=center| 3
| align=center| 3:32
| Tokyo, Japan
| 
|-
| Loss
| align=center| 8–2–4
| Eduardo Dantas
| Decision (unanimous)
| Shooto: Back To Our Roots 6
| 
| align=center| 3
| align=center| 5:00
| Tokyo, Japan
| 
|-
| Win
| align=center| 8–1–4
| Yasuhiro Akagi
| TKO (cut)
| Shooto: Back To Our Roots 4
| 
| align=center| 3
| align=center| 3:36
| Tokyo, Japan
| 
|-
| Draw
| align=center| 7–1–4
| Yasuhiro Urushitani
| Draw
| Shooto: Back To Our Roots 2
| 
| align=center| 3
| align=center| 5:00
| Tokyo, Japan
| 
|-
| Win
| align=center| 7–1–3
| Mamoru Yamaguchi
| Technical Submission (rear naked choke)
| Shooto: Champion Carnival
| 
| align=center| 1
| align=center| 1:38
| Yokohama, Japan
| 
|-
| Win
| align=center| 6–1–3
| Yusei Shimokawa
| Submission (rear naked choke)
| Shooto 2006: 9/8 in Korakuen Hall
| 
| align=center| 2
| align=center| 4:00
| Tokyo, Japan
| 
|-
| Draw
| align=center| 5–1–3
| Mamoru Yamaguchi
| Draw
| Shooto: 3/24 in Korakuen Hall
| 
| align=center| 3
| align=center| 5:00
| Tokyo, Japan
| 
|-
| Win
| align=center| 5–1–2
| Setsu Iguchi
| TKO (corner stoppage)
| Shooto: 12/17 in Shinjuku Face
| 
| align=center| 2
| align=center| 0:31
| Tokyo, Japan
| 
|-
| Win
| align=center| 4–1–2
| Chris MacGrath
| Submission (rear naked choke)
| Euphoria: USA vs. Japan
| 
| align=center| 1
| align=center| 3:17
| Atlantic City, New Jersey, United States
| 
|-
| Draw
| align=center| 3–1–2
| Yasuhiro Urushitani
| Draw
| Shooto: 9/23 in Korakuen Hall
| 
| align=center| 3
| align=center| 5:00
| Tokyo, Japan
| 
|-
| Win
| align=center| 3–1–1
| Daiji Takahashi
| Decision (unanimous)
| Shooto: 1/29 in Korakuen Hall
| 
| align=center| 2
| align=center| 5:00
| Tokyo, Japan
| 
|-
| Draw
| align=center| 2–1–1
| Toshimichi Akagi
| Draw
| Shooto: Wanna Shooto 2004
| 
| align=center| 2
| align=center| 5:00
| Tokyo, Japan
| 
|-
| Win
| align=center| 2–1
| Kenichi Sawada
| Technical Submission (rear naked choke)
| Shooto: 7/16 in Korakuen Hall
| 
| align=center| 2
| align=center| 3:34
| Tokyo, Japan
| 
|-
| Win
| align=center| 1–1
| Takeshi Sato
| Decision (unanimous)
| Shooto: 3/22 in Korakuen Hall
| 
| align=center| 2
| align=center| 5:00
| Tokyo, Japan
| 
|-
| Loss
| align=center| 0–1
| Junichi Sase
| Decision (unanimous)
| Shooto: Who is Young Leader!
| 
| align=center| 2
| align=center| 5:00
| Tokyo, Japan
|

References

External links

Living people
1979 births
Japanese male mixed martial artists
Flyweight mixed martial artists
Mixed martial artists utilizing wrestling